Javier Alejandro Gómez (born October 2, 1960), better known as Javier Gómez, is an Argentine television actor. Born in Buenos Aires, Argentina. He is best known for participating in various television channels for telenovelas such as Telemundo, RCN Televisión, Caracol Televisión and TV Azteca.

Filmography

Films

Television

Awards and nominations

References

External links 
 

1960 births
Argentine male telenovela actors
21st-century Argentine male actors
Living people